The Rushworth Football Club is an Australian rules football club based in the town of Rushworth, Victoria, Australia.  The club is one of 12 member clubs in the Kyabram & District Football League and are known as the 'Tigers'. They wear a black jumper with horizontal gold stripe.

History
The old gold-mining town of Rushworth was established during the 1850s and grew rapidly. At its peak during the late nineteenth and early twentieth centuries there were no fewer than twenty-six working mines in the locality supporting a floating population that on occasion was reckoned to number as many as 40,000 inhabitants. Football was definitely being played in the area as early as the 18870s but the Rushworth Football Club was not formed until 1882 and did not officially affiliate with a league or association until 1897, when it was a founding member, along with Murchison, Nagambie and Whroo, of the Upper Goulburn Football Association. Prior to world war one Rushworth also spent time as a member of the Goulburn Valley Football Association (1900-12) and the Waranga North East Football League (1913-14).

By the 1930s Rushworth’s most prosperous days were well behind it, and indeed the severe economic depression of that time had such an inimical impact on the town that its very survival was threatened.[1] It is somewhat paradoxical therefore that the 1930s saw the Rushworth Football Club achieving the most sustained and significant successes in its history, including a then-unprecedented four Goulburn Valley Football League premierships in a row between 1930 and 1933. Rushworth had returned to the Goulburn Valley competition when football had resumed after the Great War, and over the ensuing decade the team’s performances had steadily improved. The 1929 season brought Rushworth’s inaugural GVFL grand final, the first of ten that the side was to contest over a twelve season period. Five of these were won, making the Tigers, without doubt, the pre-eminent football force in the competition during the 1930s.

During the 1940s and 1950s country football in Victoria gradually became more outwardly professional, and hence more expensive to administer, a state of affairs that made life increasingly difficult for small clubs such as Rushworth. By the 1960s it seemed clear that the club had two choices: it could either struggle on in the GVFL, becoming increasingly less competitive as well as economically poorer until it reached the point where it had little option other than to roll over and die, or it could down-size. Swallowing a hefty dose of pride, Rushworth bravely opted for the latter course of action, and the 1965 season saw it fielding teams in the somewhat lower profile, but still intensely competitive, Heathcote District Football League.

Confirmation that the club had made the right decision duly arrived in the most gratifying way imaginable as both seniors and reserves won their respective premierships at the first time of asking. As far as the seniors were concerned, this was their first flag for three decades - far too long for a town as steeped in football lore and tradition as Rushworth, and celebrations were predictably exhaustive. The reserves had never previously won a premiership, giving further cause for celebration.

The Tigers maintained their involvement in the HDFL until 1998, contesting half a dozen senior grand finals for wins in 1965, 1969 and 1977. However, just as had been the case in the GVFL earlier in the century, the team increasingly found the going difficult, and in 1998 it was deemed necessary to make what amounted to another calculated narrowing of focus by crossing to the Kyabram District Football League. Once again, the decision was fairly swiftly ratified as the seniors made the finals in their first season, before contesting their first grand final in twenty-two years in 1999. Nagambie proved to have the Tigers’ measure on that occasion, but it was nevertheless clear that the Rushworth Football Club had found a playing level commensurate with the team’s ability. In 2004 this impression was reinforced when the senior team lost only 1 match out of 16 during the home and away rounds to advance to the finals as minor premier. Consecutive 30 point victories over Stanhope and Lancaster then gave the Tigers their first senior grade flag in more than a quarter of a century.

More recently, Rushworth made the 2011 grand final from fifth, but went down to Lancaster by 44 points in the elimination final. The last half a dozen seasons have seen the Tigers finish ninth (2013), tenth (2014), twelfth (2015), and tenth (both 2016 and 2017) and thirteenth (2018). Their last finals appearance came in 2012 when they finished fifth. 

Given that the town of Rushworth is nowadays home to scarcely 1,000 inhabitants, the continuing achievements of its football team appear quite extraordinary - until you remind yourself of the tradition, stretching back more than a hundred years, out of which it emerges; a tradition every bit as rich in its way as the seams of gold which first prompted Europeans to settle in the area in the middle of the nineteenth century.

Premierships
Goulburn Valley Football Netball League
 1930, 1931, 1932, 1933, 1935
Heathcote District Football League 
 1965, 1969, 1977
Kyabram & District Football League
 2004

External links
Official Kyabram and District Football League Website

Kyabram & District Football League clubs
Goulburn Valley Football League clubs
1882 establishments in Australia
Australian rules football clubs established in 1882